Biastophilia (from Greek biastes, "rapist" + -philia) and its Latin-derived synonym raptophilia (from Latin rapere, "to seize"), also paraphilic rape, is a paraphilia in which sexual arousal is dependent on, or is responsive to, the act of assaulting an unconsenting person, especially a stranger. Some dictionaries consider the terms synonymous, while others distinguish raptophilia as the paraphilia in which sexual arousal is responsive to actually raping the victim.

The source of the arousal in these paraphilias is the victim's terrified resistance to the assault, and in this respect it is considered to be a form of sexual sadism.

Under the name paraphilic coercive disorder, this diagnosis was proposed for inclusion in DSM-5.  This diagnosis, under the name paraphilic rapism, was proposed and rejected in the DSM-III-R. It has been criticized because of the impossibility of reliably distinguishing between paraphilic rapists and non-paraphilic rapists, and because this diagnosis, under the term Paraphilia NOS (not otherwise specified), non-consent had been used in Sexually Violent Person/Predator commitment.

A standard concept in Czechoslovakian sexology is pathologic sexual aggressivity instead. This term is strongly distinguished from sadism. This disorder is understood as a coordination anomaly of the sexual motivation system (SMS), a "courtship disorder" according to Kurt Freund or displacement paraphilia by John Money, or a missing segment of SMS.

See also 
 Penile plethysmograph#Biastophilia
 Rape fantasy
 Serial rape

References

 

Paraphilias
Sex crimes
Rape